Dorcadion ribbei is a species of beetle in the family Cerambycidae. It was described by Kraatz in 1878.

Subspecies
 Dorcadion ribbei bobrovi Danilevsky, 2001
 Dorcadion ribbei ribbei Kraatz, 1878

See also 
Dorcadion

References

ribbei
Beetles described in 1878